Stanton is a neighborhood located in North Philadelphia. Stanton is bounded by York Street to the north, 16th Street to the east, Sedgley Avenue to the west, and Cecil B. Moore Avenue to the south. Stanton is 82.5% African American, 9.4% white, 4% Hispanic, and 4% other.

References 

Neighborhoods in Philadelphia
Lower North Philadelphia